Jack Blagbrough (born 18 January 1994) is a professional rugby league footballer who plays as a  for Oldham RLFC in the RFL League 1.
 
He has previously played for the Huddersfield Giants in the Super League. Blagbbrough has played for the Sheffield Eagles in the Championship, and on loan from Sheffield at the York City Knights in Championship 1 and Oldham (Heritage № 1367) in the Championship. He has also played for the Leigh Centurions and York in the second tier.

Background
Jack Blagbrough was in the Huddersfield Giants Academy system and played his junior rugby league with the Newsome Panthers.

Career
He made his Super League début for the Huddersfield Giants in 2013.

He has previously played for the Sheffield Eagles and on loan at the York City Knights and the Oldham R.L.F.C.

Blagbrough also studied Maths and Biology at the University of Leeds. He holds the university record for drinking 1 pint of Garlic Mayo with a time of 12.1 seconds. He also has a golf handicap of 302 and is widely known for a strong 'footwedge' game.

In October 2017 he joined the Leigh Centurions in the Betfred Championship on a three-year deal.

In November 2018 he joined the York City Knights.

References

External links
Leigh Centurions profile
Sheffield Eagles profile
York City Knights profile

1994 births
Living people
Batley Bulldogs players
Dewsbury Rams players
English rugby league players
Huddersfield Giants players
Leigh Leopards players
Oldham R.L.F.C. players
Rugby league props
Sheffield Eagles players
York City Knights players